Juliana is a Peruvian drama film of 1989 by the directors Fernando Espìnoza and Alejandro Legaspi, creators of the Chaski Group, and starring Rosa Isabel Morfino.

It was the second feature film by the Chaski Group, after the film Gregorio of 1984. The film was a Peruvian box office success on its premiere (March 23, 1989), seen by 600,000 viewers in theaters. Juliana was financed by the German television channel ZDF.

Synopsis 
Juliana is a thirteen-year-old girl who runs away from home to get away from her stepfather's abuse. On the streets, she must face the struggle to survive. She soon discovers the marginalization girls face when trying to get street work and decides to cut her hair and disguise herself as a boy. She joins a group of boys who sing in Lima's microbuses, protected and exploited at the same time by a crook. Juliana's rebellious nature and her feminine strength lead her to head a child revolution.

Cast 
Rosa Isabel Morfino as Juliana
Julio Vega as Don Pedro
Maritza Gutti as Juliana's mother
Guillermo Esqueche as Juliana's stepfather 
Edward Centeno as "Clavito"
David Zuñiga as "Cobra"
Edward Alarcon as "Moni"
Elio Osejo as "Loco"
Josue Cruz as "Gusano"
Jose Ballumbrosio as "Arañita"
Miguel Ballumbrosio as "Pele"
Kelly Kaseng as "Nabo"
Martin Ijuma as "Jirafa"

Awards

References

External links 
 

1989 films
1989 drama films
Peruvian drama films
1980s Peruvian films
Films set in Peru